The Natanebi is a river in western Georgia, located in the region of Guria. It flows into the Black Sea near Shekvetili.

The Natanebi corresponds to the ancient River Isis, described by Greek historian Arrian of Nicomedia in his Periplus of the Euxine Sea.

References

Geography of Guria
Rivers of Georgia (country)
Tributaries of the Black Sea